Prosthecomicrobium  is a genus of aerobic bacteria which was isolated from freshwater samples.

References

Further reading 
 
 
 

Hyphomicrobiales
Bacteria genera